Cara Gainer (born 20 August 1995) is an English professional golfer who plays on the Ladies European Tour. She was runner-up at the 2022 Belgian Ladies Open.

Early life and amateur career
Gainer hails from Oxford and started playing golf relatively late, when she was 14-years-old, and became a scratch golfer at 17. Throughout that time she was a member at Frilford Heath Golf Club, along with Eddie Pepperell. 

She was part of the Castle Royle High Performance Academy and was Castle Royle Ladies Champion in 2015, 2016, and 2017, and was  Ladies' Amateur Champion of Oxfordshire County in 2016.

Gainer won the 2017 English Women's Open Match Play Championship at Royal Mid-Surrey Golf Club, and was in the England squad her final year as an amateur, competing internationally.

She graduated with a geography degree from Cardiff University in 2016.

Professional career
Gainer turned professional in January 2020 after LET Q-School, and joined the LET Access Series. 

In 2020, she recorded four top-20 finishes in five starts including a runner-up finish at the Czech Ladies Challenge in Prague. She ended the year in second place on the Order of Merit behind Tiia Koivisto, earning promotion to the Ladies European Tour (LET). She was also crowned LETAS Rookie of the Year.

In her rookie LET season, Gainer finished 90th in the Race to Costa del Sol. In 2022 she ended the season 41st, after she recorded a career-best finish of second at the Belgian Ladies Open, one stroke behind Linn Grant. She held the overnight lead at the season finale, the Andalucia Costa Del Sol Open De España, after a 7-under 66 in the opening round, but then produced three rounds of 72 to finish tied 14th.

Gainer opened the 2023 season with a tie for 9th at the Magical Kenya Ladies Open, having sat in 3rd ahead of the final round.

Amateur wins
2017 English Women's Open Match Play Championship

Source:

References

External links

English female golfers
Ladies European Tour golfers
Sportspeople from Oxford
1995 births
Living people
21st-century English women